A big way is a type of formation skydiving involving a large group of skydivers coming together while in freefall to form a specific and predetermined formation.  All the skydivers involved aim to connect with each other and hold the complete formation for a designated period (a number of seconds).

A sequential skydive would involve multiple formations.  Grips between individual skydivers can be on any part of the hand/arm or legs.  The jumpsuits worn are specifically designed with handle-like grips to assist.

There is a lot of behind the scenes work prior to organization of any big way event. This includes not only the invitation of individual skydivers, but also the coordination of aircraft, pilots, freefall and ground cameras as well as all support and ground staff.

Size 

The number of skydivers needed for a formation skydive to be considered a "big way" is often a contentious issue. It often depends on what is considered normal at each dropzone. For a small dropzone operating only a small Cessna aircraft that seats 5 people, anything over 5 may be considered "big".  However, for dropzones with aircraft that take more people, 6 would be considered small. There are courses available for skydivers to train to jump on formations of 100 or greater.

The largest formation ever built was the 400-way created and held over Udon Thani, Thailand on February 8, 2006.

Locations 

Big-way formation skydiving takes place all over the world, at many dropzones. For a large formation (fifty plus) the skydivers can be a group gathered from around the country, or in many cases the world, bringing together their expertise, extreme effort and drive to meet a challenge.

Team Awesome is an example of an international big-way skydiving club with members from many countries, traveling around the world to participate in big-way skydiving.

References

Sports terminology